I Luv It may refer to:
"I Luv It" (Tha Eastsidaz song), 2001
"I Luv It" (Young Jeezy song), 2006
"I Luv It" (Psy song), 2017
"I Luv It", song by Mr. Serv-On from Da Next Level 
"I Luv It", song by Sleek Louch from Silverback Gorilla 2, 2015
"I Luv It", song by Switch from Switch V, 1981
"I Luv It", song by Juice Symbolyc One (S1) production discography, 2009

See also
I Love It (disambiguation)